Events in the year 2021 in Peru.

Incumbents

Prior to elections

After the elections

Events

January to March
January 27 – A lockdown is enforced in central Peru until February 14 as hospitals near collapse. There have been 1,107,239 confirmed cases of COVID-19 and 40,107 deaths. Studies of the Sinopharm BIBP vaccine will continue during the lockdown. The first one million doses of vaccination are expected to begin in February.
February 5 – Venezuelan immigrants and refugees complain of discrimination and xenophobia leading up to elections.
February 13 – Óscar Ugarte is sworn in as the fifth health minister in a year after Pilar Mazzetti resigned in scandal after former president Martin Vizcarra jumped to the front of the line for a COVID-19 vaccine.
February 13 – Foreign minister Elizabeth Astete resigns after it is shown that government employees were given priority over health workers for COVID-19 vaccines.
February 21 – Vacunagate, a scandal related to the application of COVID-19 vaccines to politicians, business leaders, and religious leaders before essential health workers, the collapse of the health system, and the lack of oxygen, threatens the stability of the upcoming elections. Former footballer George Forsyth, leads as a candidate for president with 20% in the polls, but his candidacy has been suspended by the Jurado Nacional Electoral (JNE).
March 2 – The government does not appeal a court ruling allowing Ana Estrada, 44, the right to die. Local law still prohibits anyone from assisting voluntary euthanasia.
March 7 – Rafael López Aliaga (Popular Renewal party) is accused of urging a coup d′etat (Spanish: golpe de estado) after calling for resignation of Interim President Francisco Sagasti. Economist Hernando de Soto (Avanza País party) tweeted, "El viernes salí en favor de la democracia para rechazar el golpe contra la candidaturas de (George) Forsyth y López Aliaga. Hoy salgo para rechazar el golpe que López Aliaga quiere darle al presidente Sagasti" ("On Friday I came out in favor of democracy to reject the blow against the candidacies of (George) Forsyth and López Aliaga. Today I come out to reject the blow that López Aliaga wants to give to President Sagasti.")

April to June
April 2 – Verónika Mendoza, candidate for president (New Peru), calls Venezuelan President Nicolás Maduro a dictator during a press conference with the Asociación de Prensa Extranjera en el Perú (APEP).
April 12 — 2021 Peru bus crash
23 May - San Miguel del Ene attack – 18 people are killed by the Militarized Communist Party of Peru (MPCP), a successor of the Maoist terrorist organization Shining Path, in the Valle de los Ríos Apurímac, Ene y Mantaro (VRAEM) conflict region, where the group operates.
6 June – 2021 Peruvian general election – Pedro Castillo has a slight lead with 97.3% of the votes counted.
11 June – Left-wing groups around the world warn that Keiko Fujimori is trying to steal the election. Without any evidence, she has claimed victory.
12 June – Fujimori leads a protest seeking to annul the votes of the 2021 election.
14 June – An investigation is launched into Fujimori supporters and the Popular Force party for incidents of harassment of electoral authorities via the Internet.
23 June – 2021 Mala earthquake: A magnitude 5.9 earthquake strikes near the capital Lima, killing one and causing damage.

July to September

 28 July – Pedro Castillo is sworn-in as President of Peru.
 31 July - At least 40 people were injured after a 6.1 magnitude earthquake struck Sullana.

October to December

 28 November - 2021 Northern Peru earthquake

Deaths

January to March
January 16 – Rapper One, 41, rapper; COVID-19.
January 17 – Víctor Crisólogo, 68, politician, member of Congress (2011–2016); COVID-19.
January 18 – Carlos Burga, 68, Olympic boxer (1972); COVID-19.
January 19 – Carlos Tapia García, 79, politician, member of Congress (1985–1990) and Truth and Reconciliation Commission (2001–2003); COVID-19.
February 11
Teresa Burga, 86, artist.
Javier Neves, 67, lawyer and academic, Minister of Labor and Promotion of Employment (2004–2005); COVID-19.
February 16 – Ítalo Villarreal, journalist.
February 17 – Carlos Chacón Galindo, 86, politician, Provincial Mayor of Cusco Province (1967–1969, 1987–1989).
February 22 – Hipólito Chaiña Contreras, 67, doctor and politician, member of Congress (since 2020); COVID-19.
February 26
Herasmo García, 28, environmentalist and indigenous leader (Organización Regional de la Asociación Interétnica de Desarrollo de la Selva Peruana, Aidesep); murdered (body found on this date)
March 6
Miguel Miranda, 54, football player (Sporting Cristal, Universitario, national team) and manager.
Pedro Novoa, 46, writer and educator; colon cancer.
March 11 – Ernesto Ráez Mendiola, 84, stage director, actor and theater teacher.
March 18 – Luis Bedoya Reyes, 102, politician, Mayor of Lima (1964–1969), member of the Constituent Assembly (1978–1980) and minister of Justice (1963).
March 19 – Luis Armando Bambarén Gastelumendi, 93, auxiliary bishop of Roman Catholic Archdiocese of Lima (1968–1978), bishop of Roman Catholic Diocese of Chimbote (1983–2003) and president of the Episcopal Conference of Peru (1999–2002); COVID-19.
March 25 – Manuel Dammert, 72, sociologist and politician, member of Congress (1985–1992, 2013–2019); COVID-19.

April to June

April 1 – Jorge Chiarella Krüger, 77, theater director and actor.
April 3 – Elidio Espinoza, 65, politician, mayor of Trujillo (2015–2018), COVID-19.

July to September

 September 11 - Abimael Guzmán, leader of the Shining Path.

October to December

 October 25 - Fernando Herrera Mamani, Peruvian politician.
 November 26 - Óscar Catacora, Peruvian film director and screenwriter.
 December 1 – Raimundo Revoredo Ruiz, Peruvian prelate of the Roman Catholic Territorial Prelature of Juli (1988–1999)

See also

 History of Peru
COVID-19 pandemic in South America
Asia-Pacific Economic Cooperation

References

 
2020s in Peru
Years of the 21st century in Peru
Peru
Peru